The Colbert Prize may refer to:
A Society of Vertebrate Paleontology prize
Prix de Rome